Patricia Shanil Muluzi MP (born Patricia Fukulani) is the former First Lady of Malawi and wife of former President Bakili Muluzi.
She is a former school teacher. Although the couple had been married in 1987 and when Muluzi was running for Presidency, she lived secretly and out of the public eye. After Bakili Muluzi became president in 1994, she lived in a presidential residence near Zomba. She made her first public appearance a day before the wedding.

Wedding
The Muluzis' lavish public wedding caused much criticism due to the President's economic policies had led to a downturn in the economy. It included 3,000 guests. Guests included Presidents Robert Mugabe of Zimbabwe, Frederick Chiluba of Zambia, Joaquim Chissano of Mozambique, Pierre Buyoya of Burundi and King Mswati III of Swaziland. During the wedding 29 cows were slaughtered. Free beer, food and live music were made available in several hotels at state cost. The wedding is estimated to have cost 15m kwacha ($335,000). The head of the wedding committee, Dumiso Mulani, noted though that the president had spent some 5m kwacha of his own money. The opposition however, boycotted the event, and many mailed back their invitations in what Heatherwick Ntaba, secretary of the Malawi Congress Party and Alliance for Democracy group called "the plunder of public money".

Personal life
She has five children with Bakili Muluzi, twins, Carlucci and Edna born in 1988, followed by Zake born in 1989 and then Lucy born in 1990, finally with Tiyamike born in 1992. She was married to Muluzi in 1987 and became his second wife. As Muslims, Muluzi was married to Annie Muluzi at the time they got married and they were in a polygamous marriage arrangement. She became the second First Lady when Muluzi was elected president. Muluzi divorced his first wife, and the official First Lady, though in 1999 and remarried Patricia Muluzi in a lavish symbolic public nikkha ceremony that was criticized due to its cost in order to make her the official First Lady of Malawi. In 2011, Shanil announced that she was ending her marriage due to undisclosed  reasons.

References

Living people
First ladies and gentlemen of Malawi
Malawian women in politics
Year of birth missing (living people)